Frank Demouge (born 25 June 1982) is a Dutch former professional footballer who played as a striker. After retiring, he worked as a fitness coach.

Club career
Demouge has spent the majority of his playing career in his native the Netherlands, before moving to England in the Summer of 2012.

NEC
Demouge began his professional career at NEC Nijmegen, where he played four seasons. His debut year was his most prolific where he amassed seven goals in twenty five appearances. His second season was equally impressive, scoring four in 29 appearances. In the 2003–04 season, Demouge made his debut in the UEFA Cup, coming on as a 74th-minute substitute against Wisła Kraków. Demouge's final season was a disastrous year. With the end of his contract fast approaching, he was plagued with injuries and was eventually released from NEC.

Eindhoven
Demouge signed for Eerste Divisie side FC Eindhoven in summer 2005. During the season of 2005-06, he managed to score nine goals in twenty nine appearances and he subsequently made a move to FC Den Bosch.

Willem II
After a successful spell in the Eerste Divisie, Demouge returned to top flight football with Willem II in the summer of 2007. Shortly after joining, he suffered a knee injury and was out for few weeks. His competitive debut finally arrived in September against FC Twente where he scored an own goal in a 3–1 loss. His first goals came in a 6–0 home win against Excelsior where he scored a brace. He managed to net eight times that season. The following season was Demouge's most prolific, managing fourteen goals in thirty two appearances. During this time, there was alleged interest of the Belgian side Club Brugge and Dutch side SC Heerenveen. However, he indicated that he has an aspiration to play English football and signed an extension.

Utrecht
After attracting much interest from around Europe, he signed a three-year contract with FC Utrecht on 31 August 2010, on the transfer deadline day. During his first two seasons, he scored thirteen times in over forty three appearances, including a goal in a 3-3 UEFA Europa League draw against Italian side Napoli for whom Edinson Cavani netted a hattrick. However, again his time was plagued through injury and was released in the summer of 2012, a year before his expiration.

AFC Bournemouth
Demouge joined League One in June 2012, making the switch to England. It was reported that he was recommended by AFC Bournemouth co-chairman Max Demin. During pre-season, he injured his knee again, this time during training which required surgery.

He made his debut in a 2-1 home defeat to Walsall FC, on 29 September playing the full 90 minutes. During his second game for the Cherries, Demouge suffered a broken nose and concussion following a head collision and was stretchered off in the 11th minute. There was another setback for the Dutch striker, suffering a calf injury in a reserves game. Amid rumors of an imminent return to the Netherlands, Demouge publicly stated his commitment to the club.

Roda JC Kerkrade
After playing half a season on loan for Eredivisie side Roda JC Kerkrade, Demouge dissolved his contract with Bournemouth and signed a two-year deal with Roda JC Kerkrade.

Knokke
In September 2015 Demouge signed a one-year contract at Knokke in the Belgian Fourth Division.

He joined Dutch amateur side RKSV Heer in January 2017 after being without a club for some time.

References

External links
 Voetbal International profile 
 
 Netherlands stats at OnsOranje

1982 births
Living people
Footballers from Nijmegen
Association football forwards
Dutch footballers
Netherlands under-21 international footballers
NEC Nijmegen players
FC Eindhoven players
FC Den Bosch players
Willem II (football club) players
FC Utrecht players
AFC Bournemouth players
Roda JC Kerkrade players
Eredivisie players
Eerste Divisie players
English Football League players
Dutch expatriate footballers
Expatriate footballers in England
Dutch expatriate sportspeople in England
Expatriate footballers in Belgium
Dutch expatriate sportspeople in Belgium